La Capilla District is one of eleven districts of the province General Sánchez Cerro in Peru.

References